Dichomeris physocoma is a moth in the family Gelechiidae. It was described by Edward Meyrick in 1926. It is found in Sierra Leone.

The forewings are violet grey with a small whitish-ochreous spot on the costa before three-fourths and minute blackish marginal dots around the apical part of the costa and termen. The hindwings are rather dark grey.

References

Moths described in 1926
physocoma